The Party of Modern Serbia (SMS) is a liberal political party in Serbia. It was established on 14 December 2018 around former MPs from Enough is Enough.

History 
Five MPs that left opposition parliamentary group Enough is Enough created their own movement Centre Movement in May 2018. After negotiations with Social Democratic Alliance, they formed new party, Party of Modern Serbia on 14 December 2018. On 23 December new collective leadership was elected. The movement currently has 5 MPs in National Assembly and 3 in Vojvodina Assembly. They also have representatives in Medijana, Valjevo, Rakovica, Zvedara and Stari grad municipalities. On 24 January one MP joined the Party of Modern Serbia, making the total number of seats in the Assembly 6.

Party of Modern Serbia supported protests against president Aleksandar Vučić, and took role in opposition negotiations in January and February 2019.

Leadership of Party of Modern Serbia 
Party of Modern Serbia is ruled by a collective presidency.

Electoral performance

Parliamentary elections

Presidential elections

References 

Centrist parties in Serbia
Liberal parties in Serbia
2018 establishments in Serbia
Political parties established in 2018
Enough is Enough (party) breakaway groups